Aaron Kopp is a US-based cinematographer and film director who grew up in Eswatini.

Life

Kopp shot and co-produced Saving Face (2012), the Oscar-winning documentary about acid attacks in Pakistan. He and his partner Amanda Kopp shot for The Hunting Ground (2015), about sexual assault on American college campuses.

Aaron and Amanda Kopp's 2017 movie Liyana, eight years in the making, is a mix of documentary and animated fable. A 'story within a story', about a young girl rescuing her twin brothers from kidnappers, emerges from a storytelling workshop in Likhaya Lemphilo Lensha (New Life Homes) orphanage in Kamfishane, Shiselweni Region. Liyana is executive-produced by Thandiwe Newton, who heard about the project through filmmaker Sharmeen Obaid-Chinoy.

Filmography

As director 
 Likhaya, 2009
 Liyana, 2017

As cinematographer 
 Her Life is My Teacher, 2008
 Begin, 2009
 Del:100, 2010
 Arise, 2012
 Living on the Edge of Disaster: Climate's Human Cost, 2014
 The Hunting Ground, 2015
 Dime Short, 2017
 Turns in the Road, 2018

As cinematographer and producer 
 Saving Face, 2012

References

External links
 

Living people
Swazi film directors
Swazi cinematographers
Year of birth missing (living people)